The GAZ-53 is a 3.5 tonne 4x2 truck produced by GAZ between 1961 and 1993. Introduced first as GAZ-53F, it was joined by the virtually identical 2.5-ton GAZ-52 in 1962, which was produced until 1989. 

The GAZ-52 and GAZ-53 trucks are distinguished by different lighting systems, wheel rims and tonnage (payload): the GAZ-52 was able to carry up to 2.5 tonnes of cargo, whereas the GAZ-53A could carry up to 4 tonnes. From 1961 to 1975 the GAZ-53 was produced along with its predecessor, the GAZ-51.

Given the long production run of GAZ-52/53 and their variants, the series is a common sight in Eastern Europe, although they should not be mistaken for the broadly similar 5-6 ton ZIL-130, which is usually also painted light blue with white on the front. The GAZ grille is fluted vertically, and the direction indicators are located above the headlamps. The ZIL has flashers below the headlamps and its grille is horizontally slated.

History
The main (or basic) variant of GAZ-53 with no suffix letter was released in 1964. It featured the brand-new 4254 cc light-alloy V8 ZMZ-53 engine, which was a modified version of the one used in the GAZ-13 Chaika, which had been intended for the truck from the beginning.

Early versions, called GAZ-53F, were powered by an old 75-hp (SAE Gross) six-cylinder engine from the GAZ-51 truck; but since 1964, the GAZ-53 was equipped with a 4.3L ZMZ-53 V8 engine. Payload was increased to 4 tons in the 1965 model, called GAZ-53A. The 53A was built until January 1983, when the GAZ-53-12 took over until production ended. All variants use a four-speed gearbox, synchronised on third and fourth. A number of other sub-versions were also introduced, including the military version GAZ-53A-016.

In total, over 4 million GAZ-53 were built, making it the highest production truck of the Soviet Union.

Bulgaria
The GAZ-53A was also license-built by KTA Madara in Shumen, Bulgaria beginning in 1967. They were called the Madara 400 series (the "4" representing its four-tonne payload). Beginning in the 1970s, the Bulgarian-built trucks were fitted with locally built four-cylinder 3.9 liter Perkins diesel (later also turbodiesel) engines, made by the Vasil Kolarov engine plant in Varna. These engines had either . Madara built about 3,000 trucks per year throughout the 1980s, which met the needs of the local market.

References

External links

 AutoClub GAZ-53/52

GAZ Group trucks
Trucks of the Soviet Union
Vehicles introduced in 1961